Finca Cincuenta y Uno is a town in the Bocas del Toro Province of Panama.

Sources 
World Gazeteer: Panama – World-Gazetteer.com

Populated places in Bocas del Toro Province